The Paladin Sparrow is an American powered parachute that was designed and produced by Paladin Industries of Pennsauken, New Jersey.

The company's website was removed in 2012, the company seems to have gone out of business, although production of the Sparrow had ended prior to the company ceasing business.<

Design and development
It features a parachute-style high wing, single-place accommodation, tricycle landing gear and a single  Hirth F-33 engine with a tuned exhaust system in pusher configuration.

The aircraft is built from a combination of bolted aluminium and steel tubing. Inflight steering is accomplished with an unusual triangular control bar, similar to that found on an ultralight trike, that actuates the canopy brakes, creating roll and yaw. On the ground the aircraft has lever-controlled nosewheel steering. The aircraft was factory-supplied in the form of an assembly kit that requires 20–50 hours to complete.

Specifications (Sparrow)

References

1990s United States ultralight aircraft
Single-engined pusher aircraft
Powered parachutes